Matilde Jorge (born 7 April 2004) is a Portuguese tennis player.

Jorge has career-high WTA rankings of 626 in singles, achieved on 27 February 2023, and 150 in doubles, set on 16 January 2023. She has won ten doubles titles on the ITF Women's Circuit.

Jorge represents Portugal in the Billie Jean King Cup, playing her first tie in 2020. She has a win/loss record of 7–2 in the six ties she has played.

She is the younger sister of fellow tennis player Francisca Jorge.

ITF Circuit finals

Doubles: 16 (10 titles, 6 runner-ups)

References

External links
 
 
 

2004 births
Living people
Portuguese female tennis players
21st-century Portuguese women